"The Right Thing" is a song by British soul and pop band Simply Red, released as the first single from their second album, Men and Women (1987). The song reached #11 on the UK charts in early 1987 and #27 on the US Billboard Hot 100.

Music video
The official music video for the song was directed by Andy Morahan.

Charts

Weekly charts

Year-end charts

References

1986 songs
1987 singles
East West Records singles
Music videos directed by Andy Morahan
Song recordings produced by Stewart Levine
Simply Red songs
Songs written by Mick Hucknall